Baghsar Lake is a lake situated at 975 m above sea-level in the Samahni Valley of Bhimber District in Azad Kashmir, Pakistan. The lake is roughly half a kilometre long and overlooks the Bandala Valley. The lake is a popular tourist destination.

Many local and migratory birds, especially ducks and geese, inhabit the lake. The lake is habitat to water lilies, and the surrounding hills are covered by cheerh, or pine trees and lily flowers.

The area has several archaeological remains since Bhimber fell on the route of Mughal emperors who occasionally visited the Kashmir valley. The Baghsar Fort is situated at 3353 feet above sea level. Mughal Emperor Jahangir died on his way back from Kashmir near Sarai Sababad in 1627 AD. To preserve his body, the entrails were removed and buried here, and the body was transported to Lahore later.  

This four-story structure of granite has played important roles in history during the times of Ahmed Shah Abdali, Ranjit Singh and Gulab Singh. It is said that the Mughal Emperor Jahangir, on his way back from the Kashmir Valley, fell ill and ultimately died in this fort.

References

Lakes of Azad Kashmir
Bhimber District